Hans Olav Syversen (born 25 November 1966 in Skjervøy) is a Norwegian politician for the Christian Democratic Party.

He was elected to the Norwegian Parliament from Oslo in 2005. He previously served as a deputy representative to the Norwegian Parliament during the term 1989–1993.

During the first cabinet Bondevik, Syversen was appointed political advisor in the Ministry of Justice and the Police. He left the position in 1999. In 2003, during the second cabinet Bondevik, he was appointed State Secretary in the Ministry of Children and Family Affairs.

On the local level he was a member of Oslo city council from 1995 to 2003, being city administrative councillor (kommunalråd) since 1999. He was a member of the central party board from 1997 to 1999.

He graduated with the cand.jur. degree from the University of Oslo in 2000. He has been involved in the European Movement,

References

1966 births
Living people
Christian Democratic Party (Norway) politicians
Members of the Storting
Norwegian state secretaries
Politicians from Oslo
University of Oslo alumni
Norwegian Lutherans
21st-century Norwegian politicians
People from Skjervøy